Hoploscopa is a genus of snout moths in the subfamily Hoploscopinae of the family Crambidae. The genus was described by Edward Meyrick in 1886, with Hoploscopa astrapias as type species.

A recent taxonomic study using morphology and DNA data described an additional 26 species, so that the genus currently comprises 42 species. At least 30 more species await scientific description.

The caterpillars are reported to feed on ferns.

Species

Hoploscopa agtuuganonensis Léger & Nuss in Léger, Kehlmaier, Vairappan & Nuss, 2020
Hoploscopa albipuncta Léger & Nuss in Léger, Kehlmaier, Vairappan & Nuss, 2020
Hoploscopa albomaculata Léger & Nuss in Léger, Kehlmaier, Vairappan & Nuss, 2020
Hoploscopa anacantha Léger & Nuss in Léger, Kehlmaier, Vairappan & Nuss, 2020
Hoploscopa anamesa Tams, 1935
Hoploscopa astrapias Meyrick, 1886
Hoploscopa aurantiacalis (Snellen, 1895)
Hoploscopa boleta Léger & Nuss in Léger, Kehlmaier, Vairappan & Nuss, 2020
Hoploscopa brunnealis (Snellen, 1895)
Hoploscopa cynodonta Léger & Nuss in Léger, Kehlmaier, Vairappan & Nuss, 2020
Hoploscopa danaoensis Léger & Nuss in Léger, Kehlmaier, Vairappan & Nuss, 2020
Hoploscopa diffusa (Hampson, 1919)
Hoploscopa gombongi Léger & Nuss in Léger, Kehlmaier, Vairappan & Nuss, 2020
Hoploscopa gracilis Léger & Nuss in Léger, Kehlmaier, Vairappan & Nuss, 2020
Hoploscopa ignitamaculae Léger & Nuss in Léger, Kehlmaier, Vairappan & Nuss, 2020
Hoploscopa isarogensis Léger & Nuss in Léger, Kehlmaier, Vairappan & Nuss, 2020
Hoploscopa jubata Léger & Nuss in Léger, Kehlmaier, Vairappan & Nuss, 2020
Hoploscopa kelama Léger & Nuss in Léger, Kehlmaier, Vairappan & Nuss, 2020
Hoploscopa kinabaluensis Léger & Nuss in Léger, Kehlmaier, Vairappan & Nuss, 2020
Hoploscopa luteomacula Nuss, 1998
Hoploscopa mallyi Léger & Nuss in Léger, Kehlmaier, Vairappan & Nuss, 2020
Hoploscopa marijoweissae Léger & Nuss in Léger, Kehlmaier, Vairappan & Nuss, 2020
Hoploscopa matheae Léger & Nuss in Léger, Kehlmaier, Vairappan & Nuss, 2020
Hoploscopa mediobrunnea (de Joannis, 1929)
Hoploscopa metacrossa (Hampson, 1917)
Hoploscopa nauticorum Tams, 1935
Hoploscopa niveofascia Léger & Nuss in Léger, Kehlmaier, Vairappan & Nuss, 2020
Hoploscopa obliqua (Rothschild, 1915)
Hoploscopa ocellata (Hampson, 1919)
Hoploscopa pangrangoensis Léger & Nuss in Léger, Kehlmaier, Vairappan & Nuss, 2020
Hoploscopa parvimacula Léger & Nuss in Léger, Kehlmaier, Vairappan & Nuss, 2020
Hoploscopa persimilis (Rothschild, 1915)
Hoploscopa pseudometacrossa Léger & Nuss in Léger, Kehlmaier, Vairappan & Nuss, 2020
Hoploscopa quadripuncta (Rothschild, 1915)
Hoploscopa semifascia (Hampson, 1919)
Hoploscopa sepanggi Léger & Nuss in Léger, Kehlmaier, Vairappan & Nuss, 2020
Hoploscopa subvariegata (Rothschild, 1915)
Hoploscopa sumatrensis Léger & Nuss in Léger, Kehlmaier, Vairappan & Nuss, 2020
Hoploscopa titika Léger & Nuss in Léger, Kehlmaier, Vairappan & Nuss, 2020
Hoploscopa tonsepi Léger & Nuss in Léger, Kehlmaier, Vairappan & Nuss, 2020
Hoploscopa triangulifera (Hampson, 1919)
Hoploscopa ypsilon Léger & Nuss in Léger, Kehlmaier, Vairappan & Nuss, 2020

References

Crambidae genera
Taxa named by Edward Meyrick